Hoeksema is a surname. Notable people with the surname include:

Herman Hoeksema (1886–1965), Dutch Reformed theologian
Jack Hoeksema (born 1956), Dutch linguist
Timothy E. Hoeksema (born 1947), American businessman

See also
Susan Nolen-Hoeksema (1959–2013), American psychologist
Ilona Hoeksma (born 1991), Dutch cyclist